Liberty: Deception is a dystopian science fiction graphic novel comic book series by Travis Vengroff, self-published in 2016 under the American publishing company John Dossinger Publishing. The series, which takes place on a failed Terraforming mining colony, follows the clashes that take place between the remnants of the planet's totalitarian military state and the chaotic gangs beyond its walls. The series's covers are primarily by Eirich Olson, Casey Bailey, Jason Shawn Alexander, and Dave Dorman.

Publication history
A prototype  book called Liberty: Defiance was released in 2010  and over 3200 copies were given away at various events throughout Florida like Free Comic Book Day and Tampa Bay Comic Con  to build interest in the series. Liberty: Deception's Zero Issue was released at the Chicago Comic & Entertainment Expo in 2016 and received praise for its unique art style, paneling, detailed universe, use of dialects, and for its limited edition cover by Dave Dorman.
 
The first volume of Liberty: Deception (which contains the first three chapters) was released at New York Comic Con in October, 2016, and sold over 300 copies that weekend .
  In April, 2016 the production team raised $20,947 through Kickstarter to fund the print costs of their first volume. A French language edition has since been published by Editions KAMITI. The second volume of Liberty: Deception was released in May, 2020 digitally on ComiXology.

Synopsis
The setting is an Earth outpost beyond our solar system that has been cut off from the rest of humanity for centuries. Government propaganda actor Tertulius Justus uses his false reputation as a war hero to avoid execution at the hands of the military state after he's been fired from his job. With nowhere else to hide, he sets off for the lawless, Post-apocalyptic expanse beyond the safety of the state's walls.

Main characters
 Archon Reeve, the deified leader of the colony.
 Tertulius Justus, a television actor working for the government who is falsely portrayed to be a war hero.
 Twitch, a former member of the Rocket Punk gang.
 Claw Conway, a crude arms dealer with a prosthetic claw arm.
 Liv Conway, the leader of the Conway Brothers, who is affiliated with the Skull Clacker gang.
 Will Conway, a hacker whose body has been augmented to find hidden firearms caches that his half-brothers locate and sell.
 Gust Conway, the oldest half-brother, and sword swinging bodyguard for the Conways.

Podcast
Starting in August 2015, Fool and Scholar Productions began releasing an audiodrama podcast companion series set within the Liberty universe. Written by K.A. Statz, Liberty: Critical Research is a large cast production that follows the story of a scientific team investigating the tribes and cultures of the Southern Fringe. Between the first and second season of Critical Research, the team also released a second production called Liberty: Tales from the Tower.

Tales from the Tower features a series of unrelated horror stories set within the Liberty universe. Episodes of the Liberty podcast are released every other Tuesday, and Liberty: Critical Research was a Parsec Award finalist in 2016 under the category of 'Best New Speculative Fiction Team', as well as an Audio Verse Award finalist in 2016 for 'Best Writing of an Original, Long Form, Small Cast, Ongoing Production' and 'Best Performance of an Actor in an Original Leading Role for a Short Form Production' 

Fool and Scholar Productions has since released Liberty: Vigilance, an actual play audio drama podcast which notably features the voice talents of Wayne June from Darkest Dungeon, Ashly Burch, Sainty & Eric Nelsen, Dave Fennoy, Lani Minella, and George Lowe. Vigilance has received praise for its audio design and was nominated for several Audio Verse Awards in the fields of audio design, production, and acting.

Roleplaying game
In 2018, John Dossinger Publishing released a roleplaying game set in the Liberty universe called Liberty: AFTER. AFTER uses a modified version of the open-source rules from the 5th Edition of Dungeons & Dragons, and players can explore the world of Atrius from the perspective of a Fringer or Citizen. The Vigilance podcast was released in combination with the AFTER core rulebook and many of the artists from the comic were also involved in illustrating the book.

Motion comic and additional publications
In August 2018, the Liberty creative team released a motion comic of Liberty: Deception in collaboration with the Florida-based video game production team, Astro Crow. Notable voice acting talent involved on the motion comic includes Jon St. John, Lani Minella, and Dave Fennoy.

In addition to the core Liberty: Deception series, John Dossinger Publishing has published an iconography guidebook and a world history book called Atrius: A Citizen's Guide. The Fringe Iconography Guidebook is written from the perspective of Dr. Kovski, the protagonist of the Critical Research podcast. They have also released another Liberty comic called Bridget Goes on a Date, which includes some of characters from the Deception series. The release for Bridget Goes on a Date was held at Gods and Monsters in Orlando Florida on June 9, 2018.

See also 

 Horror podcast

References

External links

The bi-weekly podcast

2015 podcast debuts
Audio podcasts
Horror podcasts
Horror comics
2016 graphic novels
2016 comics debuts
Science fiction comics
Dystopian comics
Post-apocalyptic comics
American graphic novels
Anarchist comics
Feminist comics
Comics about women
Speculative fiction podcasts